Korytowo may refer to the following places:
Korytowo, Kuyavian-Pomeranian Voivodeship (north-central Poland)
Korytowo, Masovian Voivodeship (east-central Poland)
Korytowo, Choszczno County in West Pomeranian Voivodeship (north-west Poland)
Korytowo, Goleniów County in West Pomeranian Voivodeship (north-west Poland)